EastWest Bank, more formally known as East West Banking Corporation, is the eleventh largest bank in the Philippines in terms of assets. It was founded in 1994 in Manila by the late tycoon, Andrew Gotianun and his wife. It is a member of the Filinvest Group, led by the Gotianun family. Its headquarters is at The Beaufort, a condominium building by Filinvest in Bonifacio Global City.

History
EastWest Bank was created on July 6, 1994. It was on that date that the Bangko Sentral ng Pilipinas granted EastWest Bank its commercial banking license. Backed-up by the Filinvest Group of Companies, EastWest Bank opened to the public along Senator Gil Puyat Avenue, Makati on August 1, 1994. This was the comeback of the Gotianun's in the banking space after they sold the Insular Bank of Asia and America to PCIBank in 1986 (which was acquired by Equitable Bank forming Equitable PCI Bank which in turn was acquired by Banco De Oro in 2006) and Family Savings Bank to BPI (which was renamed BPI Family Savings Bank).

EastWest Bank has developed its online banking facilities and has embarked on a full computerization program for a more efficient system to deliver bank products and services.

In 2004, the Bank received the "Best Website Award" in the Banking and Finance category of the 7th Philippine Web Awards.

In 2003, EastWest Bank has a network of 129 branches and 145 ATM terminals, this after the merger with the former Ecology Savings Bank in 2002 and the former AIG Philam Savings Bank in 2009. The merger resulted in EastWest Bank becoming the sixth largest lender for housing, auto and credit cards in the country.

EastWest Unibank joined the Philippine Stock Exchange on May 7, 2012. The bank was later on granted a universal banking license on July 31, 2012.

Acquisition of Green Bank of Caraga
On October 31, 2013, EastWest Bank acquired Green Bank (also known as Green Bank of Caraga), the largest rural bank in the Caraga region in terms of assets. Based in Butuan, Green Bank has been serving the needs of mostly farmers, government and private employees, barangay officials, pensioners and small-scale businessmen. Through Green Bank's strong branch network in the Visayas and Mindanao, EastWest is able to gain entry into the microfinance business.

Before the asset acquisition, Green Bank, Inc. has been known  as a multi-awarded trailblazer in the area of housing microfinance. It was one of the first participating banks under the Microenterprise Access to Banking Services (MABS), a program designed to accelerate national economic transformation by encouraging Philippine rural banks to significantly expand the financial services they offer to microentrepreneurs and low-income households in the countryside. Green Bank was also recognized as among the first to use the services of an independent credit ratings agency to boost its loan quality. Green Bank will be now sold as EastWest Rural Bank (see below), which acquired the good assets of the same defunct bank.

Acquisition of Standard Chartered Bank Philippines
In 2016, EastWest acquired the retail banking business of  Standard Chartered Bank Philippines (SCB PH), which included credit cards, personal loans, wealth management, and retail deposits. SCB PH's retail accounts, personnel, and branches were all transferred to EW on November 27, 2016.

Subsidiaries and affiliates
EastWest Bank is a subsidiary of the Filinvest Development Corporation, a publicly listed company founded by Andrew Gotianun, Sr. in 1955. The Filinvest Group is composed of companies engaged in diverse businesses. It operates its real estate business primarily through its majority-owned subsidiaries, Filinvest Alabang, Inc. and Filinvest Land, Inc.

EastWest Bank joined BancNet in 1994 as an Associate member, with full use of the network's facilities and services but without voting rights. In late 2008, EastWest Bank acquired a shareholding in the network, affording the Bank a Board seat as a full member bank.

EastWest Bank is divided into the following subsidiaries:

EastWest Ageas Life Insurance Corporation
EastWest Insurance Brokerage, Inc. 
EastWest Leasing and Finance Corporation
Quest Marketing and Integrated Services, Inc.
Assurance Solutions Insurance Agency

EastWest Rural Bank, Inc. is a wholly owned subsidiary of East West Banking Corporation. A member of the Filinvest Group, led by the Gotianun Family. It is the second largest rural bank in the Philippines in terms of assets.

It was formerly known as Green Bank (or the Rural Green Bank of Caraga), was a Philippine rural bank based in Butuan and also acquired since 2013 by East West Banking Corporation alongside FinMan Bank, a rural bank based in Pasig. Prior to its acquisition it was the largest bank in the Caraga region in terms of assets, and it had 46 branches.  It was also one of three rural banks to be affiliated with the Philippine interbank network BancNet since 2006.

History
Green Bank was incorporated with the Filipino Securities and Exchange Commission as the Rural Bank of Nasipit on June 20, 1974.  The bank commenced actual operations on April 5, 1975, originally to serve the municipality of Nasipit, Agusan del Norte.

The bank took advantage of a government rediscounting program called Masagana 99, with the intention of helping poor farmers gain access to credit.  However, in the 1980s, with the plunge of the Philippine economy into recession and the assassination of Benigno Aquino Jr., Green Bank suffered a very high non-performing loan ratio due to the inability of its farmer-debtors to pay off their Masagana 99 loans.  For the next few years, the bank's financial standing gradually deteriorated.

In 1988 the Central bank of the Philippines, the Bangko Sentral ng Pilipinas issued Circular No. 1126 in 1988, designed to help recapitalize and revitalize distressed rural banks.  In the case of Green Bank, it had arrears with the Bangko Sentral amounting to some fifteen million pesos, requiring it to recapitalize to cope with capital deficiency.  Initially, stockholders refused, although some stockholders eventually agreed to aid the bank's recapitalization.

In 1989, the bank's board of directors appointed Rufa C. Susan to the position of manager, helping bring the bank back to profitability. Green Bank's capital was increased from two million pesos to twenty million pesos in 1992.  This was later increased to sixty million pesos and further on to five hundred million pesos.

The bank merged with the Rural Bank of Alegria in 2000, becoming the largest rural bank in the Caraga region. It joined BancNet in 2006, being one of three banks that joined the interbank network.

The bank followed the Grameen Bank experimentation with conversion of borrowers from joint liability loans, to individual liability loans, with no drop in repayments.

EastWest Rural Bank or EWRB (formerly FinMan Bank, Inc.) consolidates, through an asset acquisition, effective November 1, 2013 the rural banking business of the two rural banks that East West earlier acquired, namely Green Bank, Inc. and FinMan Bank, Inc.
FinMan Bank is a 16-year-old rural bank based in Pasig and engaged in extending credit to farmers, tenants, and rural enterprises. East West injected a total of P520 million in fresh capital into EWRB subsequent to the regulatory approval effective May 21, 2013 on the latter's increase in authorized capital stock from P80 million to P1 billion.

On October 31, 2013, EastWest acquired the good assets of Green Bank, Inc. (also known as the Rural Green Bank of Caraga), the largest rural bank in the Caraga Region in terms of assets. Based in Butuan, Green Bank has been serving the needs of mostly farmers, government and private employees, barangay officials, pensioners and small-scale businessmen. Through Green Bank's strong branch network in the Visayas and Mindanao, EastWest is able to gain entry into the microfinance business and expand its presence in Mindanao to increase its rural lending business. Approval was given for the acquisition in December 2013.

As of 2016, EastWest Rural Bank had a total branch network of seventy six (76) stores, including extension offices and other banking offices all throughout the country.

Ownership
Filinvest Development Corporation: 75%
PCD Nominee Corporation: 24.87%
Philippine Air Force Educational Fund: 00.03%
Washington Sycip: 00.03%

See also

BancNet
List of banks in the Philippines

References

External links 

 Official website

Banks established in 1994
Banks of the Philippines
Companies based in Bonifacio Global City
Companies listed on the Philippine Stock Exchange
1994 establishments in the Philippines